The Back Series is a series of four bas-relief sculptures, by Henri Matisse. They are Matisse's largest and most monumental sculptures. The plaster originals are housed in the Musée Matisse in Le Cateau-Cambrésis, France.

They were modeled between 1909 and 1930. Back (I) appeared in the second PostImpressionist show in London and the Armory Show in New York City.

All four sculptures were unique plaster casts until 1950, when Back (I), (III), and (IV) were cast in bronze. Back (II) was rediscovered in 1955, a year after the artist’s death, and then cast. The series have been cast in a bronze edition of twelve, including one for the artist's family. Nine complete sets are housed in nine major museums around the world:
 Musée National d'Art Moderne (Paris)
 Tate (London)
 Kunsthaus Zürich (Zürich)
 Staatsgalerie Stuttgart (Stuttgart)
 Museum of Modern Art (New York)
 Hirshhorn Museum and Sculpture Garden (Washington D. C.)
 Franklin D. Murphy Sculpture Garden (Los Angeles)
 Kimbell Art Museum (Fort Worth)
 Lillie and Hugh Roy Cullen Sculpture Garden, Museum of Fine Arts (Houston)

See also
 List of public art in Houston

References

Sculptures of the Museum of Modern Art (New York City)
Sculptures of the Tate galleries
Franklin D. Murphy Sculpture Garden
Hirshhorn Museum and Sculpture Garden
Sculptures of the Smithsonian Institution
Bronze sculptures in Washington, D.C.
Bronze sculptures in California
Bronze sculptures in New York City
Bronze sculptures in Texas
Bronze sculptures in the United Kingdom
Bronze sculptures in France
Bronze sculptures in Germany
Bronze sculptures in Switzerland
Outdoor sculptures in Washington, D.C.
Outdoor sculptures in Greater Los Angeles
Sculptures in Paris
1909 sculptures
1910 sculptures
1930 sculptures
Sculpture series
Henri Matisse
Nude sculptures
Lillie and Hugh Roy Cullen Sculpture Garden